Janjigian is an Armenian surname. Notable people with the surname include:

Dan Janjigian (born 1972), Armenian-American actor, bobsledder, and political candidate
Thomas Janjigian (born 1994), American soccer player
Vahan Janjigian, American businessman

Armenian-language surnames